The IRA Memorial is a memorial in Athlone, County Westmeath. The memorial is dedicated to the Athlone Brigade of the Irish Republican Army that participated in the Irish War of Independence and Irish Civil War.

Description
The limestone statue consists of a life-sized male figure, dressed in typical Irish Republican Army uniform from the time period. The statue stands on a two-stage plinth. The memorial is surrounded by metal railings, and set back from the road.

History 
The limestone statue was created by Desmond Broe, a member of a prominent family of sculptors from Harold's Cross, County Dublin. The statue was unveiled in 1953 and stands on the corner of Church Street and Custume Place, close to the banks of the River Shannon.

References 

Athlone
Monuments and memorials in the Republic of Ireland
Outdoor sculptures in Ireland
Sculptures of men in Ireland
Irish Republican Army memorials